Bakul Priya (Bengali: বকুল প্রিয়া) is a 1997 Bengali drama film directed by Swapan Saha and produced under the banner of Maa Kali Chitramandir. The film features actors Prosenjit Chatterjee and Satabdi Roy in the lead roles. Music of the film has been composed by Anwar Jahan Jhantu.

Cast 
 Prosenjit Chatterjee as Bakul
 Satabdi Roy as Priya
 Abhishek Chatterjee as Gourab
 Subhendu Chatterjee as Priya's Father
 Manoj Mitra as Bakul's Father
 Anushree Das
 Subhasish Mukhopadhyay
 Soham Chakraborty as Young Bakul
 Gora Sarkar
 Aditi Chattopadhyay

Music
"Jiboner Nouka Chole"- Andrew Kishore, Sabina Yasmin 
"Tumi Bondhu Amar, Chiro Sukhe Thako" - Andrew Kishore 
"Premer Somadhi Bhenge" - Andrew Kishore 
"Amare Ki Bhuila Gechho" - Sabina Yasmin

References

External links
 
 Bakul Priya (1997) at the Gomolo

1997 films
Bengali-language Indian films
Films directed by Swapan Saha
1990s Bengali-language films
Indian romantic drama films
Films scored by Anwar Jahan Nantu